Nathaniel Bernard Najar (born August 28, 1981), known professionally as Nate Najar, is an American guitarist, music producer, and composer who plays classical guitar within the jazz tradition.

Early life 
A native of St. Petersburg, Florida, Najarr studied classical guitar in his teens with Frank Mullen.

Career 
Najar has worked with Ken Peplowski, John Lamb, Bucky Pizzarelli, Eric Darius, Chuck Redd, Buster Cooper, Cindy Bradley, Jessy J, and Jonathan Fritzén.

Najar's musical style is influenced by Charlie Byrd, a fingerstyle guitarist who played bossa nova and Brazilian jazz. Najar plays one of Byrd's instruments, a 1974 Ramírez 1A classical guitar.

In addition to local and international festivals and concerts Najar has performed on television composed for films.

Najar has been ranked multiple times on the jazz music charts, including a top ten spot in 2011 for the song "Groove Me", on which he collaborated with singer Melba Moore.

As producer and composer, Najar has worked and recorded throughout the U.S. and abroad at venues and studios such as Nola studios in New York City, where he recorded an album by Lisa Casalino.

References

21st-century American guitarists
American jazz musicians
American jazz guitarists
1981 births
Living people